Frances Wheeler Sayler (December 18, 1916 – April 27, 1957) was an American civil rights and labor activist. She worked on the La Follette Committee and for the United States Women's Bureau, before becoming an organizer with the United Electrical, Radio and Machine Workers of America union. She was active in the early civil rights movement, fighting to desegregate facilities and abolish the poll tax.

Early life and education
Frances Lee Wheeler was born on December 18, 1916 in Butte, Montana to Lulu M. (née White) and Burton K. Wheeler. She was the middle daughter of the family of three girls and three boys: John L., Elizabeth H., Edward K., Frances, Richard B., and Marion M. Her father was a lawyer, who served as a US Senator from 1923 to 1947. She attended Mount Holyoke College and then completed her schooling at Connecticut College in 1937.

Career
Wheeler began her career working for the United States Women's Bureau. In the mid-1930s, she served on the La Follette Committee, a government inquiry into anti-union policies used by employers in the interwar period. In 1938, she began working for the National Labor Relations Board. Wheeler was active in the women's poll tax repeal movement and in the early 1940s, served as an executive secretary of the National Committee to Abolish the Poll Tax. Using her networks, she was able to secure office space for the committee through ties to the railroad union. She married Allen Sayler, a fellow government worker on August 15, 1941 in Sandy Spring, Maryland. Her parents refused to attend her wedding because of her and her husband's left-leaning politics.

Sayer and her husband first lived in Maryland. They were active in the early civil rights movement. She campaigned to desegregate movie theaters and restaurants in Bethesda, Chevy Chase, and Rockville. Allan promoted interracial education and organized a successful conference for the Elks Lodge in Washington, D.C. After she left government service in 1942, Sayler worked for the United Electrical, Radio and Machine Workers of America union, an affiliate of the Congress of Industrial Organizations. She acted as a liaison between unions and union members and government. She also was named to various labor advisory committees of the War Production Board to improve relationships between various industry sectors.

In 1945, Saylor moved to Detroit, Michigan and worked as a labor organizer. She orchestrated the 1946 strike by the workers at the Whyte Electric Company, in a two week strike, which made nationwide headlines. She continued working with the United Electrical, Radio and Machine Workers of America until 1950, when she left because the birth of her first daughter, Diana. Three years later she had a second daughter, Gloria.

In 1955, Sayler was subpoenaed by the House Un-American Activities Committee and questioned for suspected ties to communism. Her father served as her legal counsel and though he did not support McCarthyism, he justified the actions of Joseph McCarthy, which was difficult for his daughter. She wanted to refuse her cooperation with the committee, but her father persuaded her to answer their questions and insist that she was not anti-American.

Death and legacy
Sayler died from a brain tumor at the National Institutes of Health in Bethesda, Maryland on April 27, 1957 Sayler researched and began writing her father's biography in 1946. She was unable to complete the work before her death, but in 1962 Paul F. Healy used her materials as the foundation for his book, Yankee from the West: The Candid, Turbulent Life Story of the Yankee-born U.S. Senator from Montana.

References

Citations

Bibliography

1916 births
1957 deaths
People from Butte, Montana
Mount Holyoke College alumni
Connecticut College alumni
United States Department of Labor officials
Activists from Montana
American civil rights activists
Workers' rights activists
United Electrical, Radio and Machine Workers of America people
Women government officials
American women civil servants
Deaths from brain cancer in the United States
Deaths from cancer in Maryland
American anti-poll tax activists
20th-century American women
20th-century American people
Women civil rights activists